Cyperus pulcher is a species of sedge that is native to southern parts of Africa.

See also 
 List of Cyperus species

References 

pulcher
Plants described in 1794
Flora of South Africa
Taxa named by Carl Peter Thunberg